Living Proof may refer to:

Film and television
 Living Proof: The Hank Williams Jr. Story, a 1983 American television film
 Living Proof (2008 film), an American television film directed by Dan Ireland
 Living Proof (2017 film), a documentary about a person with multiple sclerosis
 "Living Proof" (Arrow), a television episode

Music

Albums
 Living Proof (Buddy Guy album) or the title song, 2010
 Living Proof (Cher album), 2001
 Living Proof: The Farewell Tour, a concert tour by Cher, 2002–2005
 Living Proof (IQ album), 1986
 Living Proof (State Champs album), 2018
 Living Proof (Sylvester album), 1979
 Living Proof and Living Proof: The MGM Recordings 1963-1975, two albums by Hank Williams, Jr., 1974 and 1992, respectively
 Living Proof, by Sarah Whatmore, unreleased

Songs
 "Living Proof" (Camila Cabello song), 2019
 "Living Proof" (Ricky Van Shelton song), 1989
 "The Living Proof", by Mary J. Blige from The Help soundtrack, 2011
 "Living Proof", by Bad Meets Evil from Hell: The Sequel, 2011
 "Living Proof", by Bruce Springsteen from Lucky Town, 1992
 "Living Proof", by Cat Power from The Greatest, 2006
 "Living Proof", by Gregory Alan Isakov from The Weatherman, 2013
 "Living Proof", by Hank Williams, Jr. from Hank Williams Jr. and Friends, 1976
 "Living Proof", by Wishbone Ash from Just Testing, 1980

Other uses
 Living Proof, a 2012 novel by Kira Peikoff
 Living Proof Radio, KWTW, a Christian radio network based in Bishop, California, US